Qiu Yingling (born July 8, 1980, in Yangchun, Yangjiang, Guangdong) is a female Chinese field hockey player who competed at the 2004 Summer Olympics.

She finished fourth with the Chinese team in the women's competition. She played three matches.

External links
 
profile

1980 births
Living people
Field hockey players at the 2004 Summer Olympics
Olympic field hockey players of China
Chinese female field hockey players
People from Yangjiang
Sportspeople from Guangdong